Eriophyllum jepsonii is a rare North American species of flowering plant in the family Asteraceae known by the common name Jepson's woolly sunflower. It is endemic to California, where it has been found in the Central Coast Ranges and adjacent hills from Contra Costa County to Ventura County.

Eriophyllum jepsonii grows in dry habitat such as chaparral and oak woodland. This is a small shrub producing woolly, whitish stems 50 to 80 centimeters (20-32 inches) tall. It is lined with lobed oval leaves each a few centimeters long and coated in woolly fibers. The inflorescence produces one or more flower heads containing many glandular or bristly yellowish disc florets surrounded 6 to 8 yellow ray florets each up to a centimeter long. The fruit is an achene tipped with a pappus of approximately 8 scales.

References

External links
Calflora distribution for Eriophyllum jepsonii
Jepson Manual Treatment of Eriophyllum jepsonii
United States Department of Agriculture Plants Profile for Eriophyllum jepsonii
Calphotos Photos gallery − Eriophyllum jepsonii, University of California

jepsonii
Endemic flora of California
Natural history of the California chaparral and woodlands
Natural history of the California Coast Ranges
Plants described in 1891
Taxa named by Edward Lee Greene
Flora without expected TNC conservation status